is a series of Japanese light novels written by Sai Yukino and illustrated by Kairi Yura set in fictional ancient China. As of July 2011, the eighteenth and final volume was released, concluding the series. Four side story anthologies have also been released, collecting stories originally published in The Beans magazine.

A manga version, also illustrated by Kairi Yura, is serialized in Beans Ace, which is published by Kadokawa Shoten. However, when Beans Ace ended, the manga was moved to Monthly Asuka. Currently, nine tankōbon volumes have been released. The series has been licensed by Viz Media for an English release in North America as part of their Shojo Beat imprint.

The anime adaptation series, produced by Madhouse and directed by Jun Shishido, was broadcast on the Japanese television network NHK on Saturday mornings. The first season began airing on April 8, 2006, and completed its run on February 24, 2007, airing a total of 39 episodes. The second season, titled  began airing on April 7, 2007 and consists of another 39 episodes, ending its run on March 8, 2008. A live action Chinese drama adaptation is set to be released in 2023.

Plot

Set in the fictional empire of Saiunkoku, the story centers on Shurei Hong (Kou), a descendant of a noble family that has fallen on hard times. Her father works as a librarian in the Imperial palace, a post which offers prestige and respect, but little compensation. Shurei teaches in the temple school and works odd jobs to make ends meet, but her dream is to pass the imperial examinations and take a post in government, a career path forbidden to women.

The new Emperor, Ryuuki Shi, has gained a reputation for being uninterested in courtly matters and for flaunting his love for men. So the Emperor's Grand Adviser makes a startling offer for her to join the imperial household for six months as the young Emperor's consort and teach the Emperor to be a responsible ruler. She easily accepts the invitation as she will receive a reward of 500 gold coins if she succeeds. The mysterious Seiran, a young man who was adopted by her father, goes with her as Ryuuki's bodyguard. Entering the imperial palace revives Shurei's dream of being a court official.

The story details the hardships of creating change, especially as a woman, Shurei's growing relationship with the Emperor and other members of the court, the intrigues of imperial politics, and her commitment to better herself and her country.

Main characters 

 is the daughter and only child of Shōka Hong. She is sixteen years old when the story begins. As a descendant of the direct line, she has the title hime, which means 'Princess' or 'Lady'. Despite the high social status of her family, Shūrei grew up in relatively impoverished circumstances. Shūrei is the first woman in the history of Saiunkoku to pass the Imperial Exams with the third-highest score.  Shūrei later accepts a position as an official in the Censorate or Inspector in the capital.

 is a young man in his early twenties and is the sole remaining retainer in the personal household of Shōka Hong, who took him in thirteen years ago. Seiran is later revealed to be , Ryuuki's second-eldest brother. Though he claims to be 21 years old, he is actually 26 years old at the start of the series.

 is Shūrei's father, Seiran's adoptive father and the eldest son of the Hong clan. Despite his mild-mannered exterior, Shōka is a deadly assassin known as The Black Wolf.

 was the mother of Shūrei, adoptive mother of Seiran, and wife of Shōka. She had the ability to cure any illness and many men sought her hand in marriage. Shokun is revealed to be the Red Immortal, one of the Eight Sages who served the first emperor. Her spell makes Shūrei healthier by sealing her spirit within her daughter.

 holds the rank of Vice-Secretary of the Department of Civil Administration, serving beneath Reishin Hong, who is also his foster father. Kōyū is notorious for not having sense of direction, and constantly getting lost in the Imperial Palace, and unable to get anywhere without the assistance of others.  Kōyū has a close relationship with Shūei Ran, though he loudly denies being the latter's friend. He loses his temper with very little prodding and gets tongue-tied speaking in official functions with large crowds.

 is in charge of the Department of Civil Administration, which makes him Kōyū's bureaucratic superior as well as adoptive father. He is a good friend of his fellow official Kijin Kou. Kijin describes him as being crafty and coldhearted, but Reishin usually seems very cheerful, easy-going, and even childish. He often engages in devious and secretive behavior, especially regarding his family.

 is Reishin's wife and Kōyū's adoptive mother. Unlike her husband, Yuri is practical and straightforward in her manner, as well as kind and thoughtful; Shōka attributes her influence as the reason why Kōyū was able to become a capable young man.  She is also responsible for helping to raise Kurō during his childhood and she is well-regarded in the Hong clan. 

, the youngest brother of Shōka and Reishin, acts as the proxy head of the Hong clan and many outsiders believe him to be the true leader. A man of tradition and family loyalty, Kurō urged their father to pass over Shōka in favor of Reishin as the next clan leader. Despite his rigid and formal attitude, he cares greatly for the well-being of his family.

 is the reigning emperor of Saiunkoku, Ryūki Shi is nineteen years old when the story begins. As the youngest of the previous Emperor's six sons, each from a different mother, he had been an unlikely candidate to ascend to the throne. In childhood, Ryūki was badly treated by his mother and most of his half-brothers, who would beat him and lock him in a storage house for days in a row.  Ryūki often took refuge in the garden or the imperial archives.

 is the Chief Minister of the Department of Treasury and Taxation. Many people consider him mysterious and eccentric, especially because of his unusual appearance. He leaves his hair loosely flowing instead of binding it up according to custom, and is almost never seen without one of the masks from his wide collection. In his official capacity, Kijin tends to be very strict, but he is gracious to Shūrei when she begins to work for him.

 is one of the three Grand Officials of the Palace, holding the title of Taiho.  Sa-Taiho has held a long history of frustrated ambition. He never manages to surpass Advisor Sho, his longtime friend and fellow Grand Official.

 is a mild-mannered man in his late thirties who walks with a cane. Despite his gentle exterior, Yūshun is considered to be dangerous and very powerful. Yūshun is an effective politician who can accurately predict the current situation, and can be persuasive in debate.

 is the beautiful mistress of Kougaro, the most prestigious pleasure house in the red-light district. She is fond of Shūrei, who worked as her accountant for many years. Not only is she one of the most sought-after courtesans, she is also the underground boss in charge of the region.

 is an official working for the Inspector General. He is prone to thoughtlessly saying whatever is on his mind and regarded as a fool, despite being highly perceptive and critical. Because he does not like putting effort into anything, Suoh is both intrigued and annoyed by Shūrei's continual determination to do her best. Suou can perceive a situation's complete context or a person's true character, and he tries to lessen Shūrei's naiveté by showing her the evils of the world.

 is the undersecretary of Censorate, known as the "Official Killer" for his ruthless persecution of officials. Seiga is an ambitious and cynical man who does not think highly of Shūrei and he often harasses her.  A promising and confident official, he is known for his willingness to sacrifice others to achieve his goals.

 makes his first appearance as a half-starved man lying in front of Shūrei's estate. Seiran dislikes him because of their shared past in the Satsujinzoku gang, when Ensei earned the nickname of "Little rascal King." Ensei's true specialty is close-range unarmed combat. He has a cross-shaped scar under his left eye and initially sports a bushy beard which irritates Shūrei and makes many people describe him as a bear.

 is a shy, intelligent thirteen-year-old boy.  He was born in Seika village, Koku province, but the rest of the village was wiped out by plague. Eigetsu does not like to consume alcohol or even smell it, because it literally turns him into another person: , who is brash, arrogant, and an excellent fighter.  In contrast to Eigetsu's gentle manner and academic inclinations, Yōgetsu's intelligence leans towards being calculating and strategic.

Media

Light novels
Written by Sai Yukino and illustrated by Kairi Yura, the light novel series The Story of Saiunkoku has been serialized in The Beans since 2003. The individual chapters are collected and published in full novel volumes by Kadokawa Shoten with the first volume released in Japan on October 31, 2003. As of July 2011, 18 volumes have been released for the series.

Side stories
Sai Yukino has written a series of short side stories for The Story of Saiunkoku which are published in collected volumes by Kadokawa Shoten. The first volume was released in April 2005; the fifth in March 2012.

Manga
Written by Sain Yukino and illustrated by Kairi Yura, a manga adaptation of The Story of Saiunkoku began serialization in Beans Ace in 2005 where it continues to run. However, on October 9, 2009, the magazine ended its publication and the series continued in Monthly Asuka until 2012. The individual chapters are published in tankōbon volumes by Kadokawa Shoten, with the first released in June 2006. As of April 2012, nine volumes have been released. The series has been licensed by Viz Media for an English release beginning in November 2010.

Anime

Produced by Madhouse and directed by Jun Shishido, the anime adaptation of The Story of Saiunkoku premiered in Japan on NHK on April 8, 2006. The first season ran for 39 episodes until its conclusion on February 24, 2007. The second season, referred to as Saiunkoku Monogatari 2nd Series, premiered on April 7, 2007 and ran for another 39 episodes until its conclusion on March 8, 2008.

In May 2007, Geneon Entertainment announced it had acquired the license to releases the anime in North America with English language options. In September 2007, after only two volumes had been released, Geneon closed its North America operations. In July 2008, Funimation announced that it will distribute several Geneon titles, including The Story of Saiunkoku. Funimation let the license expire in 2011.

The series uses three pieces of theme music.  by Ayaka Hirahara is used for the opening theme for both the first and second seasons. For the ending theme,  by Sachi Tainaka is used for the first season, while  by Teruya Miho is used for the second season.

Soundtracks
Three CD soundtracks have been released by Geneon Entertainment for The Story of Saiunkoku, using music from the anime adaptation.  was released on August 4, 2008 containing 38 individual tracks, including the television length opening and ending themes. The second followed on January 12, 2007 with an additional 30 tracks. On December 7, 2007, a third soundtrack, was released containing 23 tracks from the second season of the series. The two series ending themes were released to CD singles on August 30, 2006 and June 6, 2007, respectively. On March 7, 2008, an additional CD soundtrack, Song of Memory was released containing 10 tracks with various character image songs.

Drama CDs
Three drama CD series have been created around The Story of Saiunkoku. The first series, spanned three volumes and covered the first season of the anime. The first volume was released on September 8, 2006; the second and third volumes followed on November 10, 2006 and March 9, 2007, respectively.

The second series, also spanned three CDs which were released between August 25, 2006 and December 21, 2007.

The final three volume series, covers events from the second series of the anime. The first volume was released on September 7, 2007, with the remaining volumes following on November 9, 2007 and February 2, 2008.

Other
A web-based radio program for the series aired in Japan. Hosted by Tomokazu Seki and Hikaru Midorikawa, the program included mini-stories and special guests discussion the series. The program was released across two CDs in Japan by Geneon Entertainment. The first was released on May 25, 2007 with the first seven broadcasts and a bonus track. The second CD, containing the remaining six broadcasts and a bonus character song, was released on October 24, 2007.

On August 28, 2007, an art book for The Story of Saiunkoku was released in Japan.  included art work from series illustrator Kairi Yura, episode summaries for the first season of the anime adaptation and a bonus short story by author Sai Yukino. A second art book, was released on June 10, 2008 containing more art work for the series, as well as episode summaries from the second anime season and another bonus short story.

References

External links

Official Kadokawa Story of Saiunkoku website 
Official NHK Story of Saiunkoku anime website 
Official Funimation Story of Saiunkoku anime website
/ Official facebook The story of Saiunkoku

2003 Japanese novels
2005 manga
Anime and manga based on light novels
Chinese mythology in anime and manga
Geneon USA
Historical fantasy anime and manga
Kadokawa Beans Bunko
Kadokawa Dwango franchises
Kadokawa Shoten manga
Light novels
Madhouse (company)
NHK original programming
Romance anime and manga
Shōjo manga
TVB original programming
Viz Media manga